"Tell it to the Marines" is an idiom. The phrase may also refer to:

 Tell It to the Marines (1918 film), starring Jane Lee
 Tell It to the Marines (1926 film), starring Lon Chaney, William Haines and Eleanor Boardman
 Tell It to the Marines (TV series), a British sitcom that aired from 1959 to 1960